Halloran may refer to:

People 
Amy Halloran, American actress
Antoinette Halloran, Australian operatic soprano
Ben Halloran (born 1992), Australian international football (soccer) player
Bob Halloran (disambiguation)
Brenda Halloran, Canadian politician
Dan Halloran (born 1971), former member of the New York City Council
Jack Halloran (1916–1997), American composer and choral director
James Halloran (died 2007), British communication scholar
Kay Halloran (born 1937), American politician
Laurence Hynes Halloran (1765–1831), Australian schoolteacher, journalist, and bigamist
Lia Halloran (born 1977), American painter and photographer
Peter Halloran (born 1962), founder and CEO of Pharos Financial Group
Shawn Halloran (born 1964), American football player, coach, and high school sports administrator
Walter Halloran (1921–2005), Catholic priest of the Society of Jesus

Fictional 
Dick Hallorann, a character in the Steven King novel The Shining

Places 
Halloran, New South Wales, Australia
Halloran, Missouri, United States
Halloran Springs, California, United States

Other uses 
USS Halloran (DE-305)

See also
O'Halloran